Charles Walter Dressen (September 20, 1894 – August 10, 1966) was an American third baseman, manager and coach in professional baseball during a career lasting almost fifty years, and was best known as the manager of the Brooklyn Dodgers of 1951–1953. Indeed, Dressen's "schooling" of a young baseball writer is one of the most colorful themes in Roger Kahn's classic 1972 memoir, The Boys of Summer.

NFL quarterback and MLB third baseman
Born in Decatur, Illinois, Dressen was a veteran baseball man when he took the reins in Brooklyn after the  season. He began his professional career with the Moline Plowboys of the Class B Three-I League in 1919. Despite his small stature, Dressen also played professional football during his apprenticeship as a minor league baseball player. He was a quarterback for the Decatur Staleys (a forerunner of the Chicago Bears) in 1919–1920 and the Racine Legion of the National Football League in 1922–1923.

After he turned to baseball full-time in 1924, Dressen batted .346 in the top-level American Association, paving the way for his 646-game Major League Baseball playing career. Dressen played for the Cincinnati Reds from 1925–1931, and was the club's starting third baseman from 1926–1929. He also was a late-season member of the  New York Giants. All told, he batted .272 with 603 hits in the majors.

Dressen's first opportunity to manage came in 1932 as the playing skipper of the Nashville Vols of the Southern Association. He interrupted that assignment late in 1933 to fill in as a third baseman for the Giants during the pennant drive when regular Johnny Vergez was forced out of the lineup because of appendicitis. Dressen started a dozen September games, batting .222.

Although he didn't play during the 1933 World Series, he helped the Giants win Game 4. With New York leading the game by a single run in the bottom of the 11th inning, the opposition Washington Senators loaded the bases with one out, and sent up rookie pinch hitter Cliff Bolton. On his own initiative, Dressen called time, ran from the dugout, and told Giants' first baseman and player-manager Bill Terry how to pitch and defend Bolton, against whom Dressen had managed in the Southern Association. Bolton promptly bounced into a double play and the Giants won to take a three-games-to-one lead in the Series, which they ultimately won in five games. The incident stamped Dressen as a potential major league manager.

Association with Larry MacPhail
He then returned to Nashville and managed the Vols to a second-place finish in 1938.

Despite his poor won-lost record (214–282, .431) in Cincinnati, Dressen made a valuable ally in the Reds’ mercurial general manager, Larry MacPhail. In , a year after MacPhail became president and general manager of the Dodgers, he named fiery shortstop Leo Durocher player-manager and Dressen as his third base coach. But when MacPhail resigned in October 1942 to rejoin the armed forces and was succeeded by Branch Rickey, Dressen was fired from Durocher's staff — reportedly because he refused to eschew betting on horses. He was on the sidelines for the first three months of the  season before being rehired by the Dodgers that July.

As the Second World War was ending, MacPhail returned to baseball as part owner, president and general manager of the New York Yankees. Following the  campaign, he raided the Dodger coaching staff, signing Dressen and Red Corriden as aides under his new manager, Bucky Harris. The raids contributed to a public feud between MacPhail on one side and Durocher and Rickey on the other. Commissioner of Baseball Albert B. Chandler suspended Durocher for the entire  season for "conduct detrimental to baseball", suspended Dressen for 30 days for signing a Yankee contract while still an employee of the Dodgers, and fined both clubs and some of their employees.

MacPhail left baseball after the Yankees' 1947 World Series victory over the Dodgers, and Harris was sacked after the Bombers' third-place  finish. Dressen was not retained by Harris' successor, Casey Stengel, but instead he replaced Stengel as the manager of the Oakland Oaks of the Triple-A Pacific Coast League. He skippered the Oaks in 1949–1950 and his teams finished second and first, winning 104 and 118 games during the PCL's elongated regular-season schedule. Simultaneously, a power struggle for control of the Dodgers ended in Walter O'Malley forcing Rickey out of the Brooklyn front office.

Leader of Brooklyn's 'Boys of Summer'
Dressen's Dodgers, unlike his Reds of a decade and a half before, were a perennial contender in the National League, with a lineup that included five future members of the Baseball Hall of Fame — Roy Campanella, Gil Hodges, Pee Wee Reese, Jackie Robinson and Duke Snider.

Brooklyn charged into first place early in the  season, while the New York Giants — led since July 16, 1948, by Durocher himself — struggled (despite the callup of the 20-year-old rookie Willie Mays). When the Dodgers completed a three-game sweep of the Giants at Ebbets Field on August 10, the Brooklyn lead over the Giants reached  games. The following day, when Brooklyn won the first game of a doubleheader against the Boston Braves and the Giants fell to the Philadelphia Phillies, the Dodger lead stood, albeit briefly, at  games.

However, the Giants then began to win. With Sal Maglie, Larry Jansen and Jim Hearn anchoring their starting rotation — and (according to some accounts) with a "spy" stealing signs from their center-field clubhouse at their home field, the Polo Grounds — the Giants won sixteen in a row in August and 37 of their last 44 games (.841) while the Dodgers went 26–22 (.542) over the same period. At the end of the regular season, the teams were tied, necessitating a best-of-three game playoff to determine who won the league pennant. In the ninth inning of the decisive third game at the Polo Grounds, Dodger starting pitcher Don Newcombe had a 4–2 lead and two men on base when Dressen decided to go to the bullpen, where Carl Erskine and Ralph Branca were warming up. "Erskine is bouncing his curve", the manager was told by his bullpen coach, Clyde Sukeforth. Dressen summoned Branca, whose second pitch to Bobby Thomson was hit into the lower left-field stands for a three-run homer, a 5–4 Giants win, and a National League pennant — Baseball's "Shot Heard ‘Round the World".

But they came up short against Stengel's Yankees in the World Series both times, losing in seven games in 1952 and six in 1953. Fresh from winning the  pennant with 105 regular-season victories, Dressen decided to publicly demand a three-year contract from O’Malley instead of the customary one-year deal the Dodgers then offered their managers. When O'Malley didn't yield, Dressen effectively resigned when the owner allowed his old contract to expire. He was replaced by Triple-A Montreal Royals manager Walter Alston — a veteran minor leaguer who was then a relative unknown to Brooklyn fans and media. Alston went on to sign 23 consecutive one-year contracts with O'Malley, while winning seven NL pennants, four World Series, and a berth in the Baseball Hall of Fame.

Struggles in Washington and Milwaukee
Dressen returned to Oakland to manage the PCL Oaks in 1954 while he sorted out his big-league future, then was hired to replace Bucky Harris at the helm of the Washington Senators, who had gone 66–88 to finish sixth in the eight-team American League in 1954.

Dressen inherited a second division team with a poor farm system. Nevertheless, baseball observers predicted that he would rouse the Senators from their doldrums with his managerial acumen. On September 30, 1954 (Season 5 Episode 3), Dressen himself appeared on the Groucho Marx quiz program, You Bet Your Life, and predicted that the Senators would finish in the first division (fourth place or higher). His former boss O'Malley said, "Dressen will steal at least six games for Washington in 1955." Dressen also told his team, "I guarantee we won't finish in sixth place again." He was right – but the 1955 Senators (53–101) finished eighth and last, the 1956 edition (59–95) finished seventh, and the 1957 club was 4–16 (and last again) on May 7, 1957, when Dressen was fired. His Senators won only 116 of 328 games — a winning percentage of .354. The team's next winning season would have to wait until , after the franchise had become the Minnesota Twins.

When the 1959 Dodgers won the World Series, Dressen was in demand as a manager once again. The Dodgers' then-archrivals, the Milwaukee Braves, were seeking to replace Fred Haney, their veteran manager who stepped down after his club lost the 1959 National League tie-breaker series to Alston's Dodgers. The Braves (1957–1958) and Dodgers (1955–1956; 1959) dominated the late-1950s National League, winning every pennant over the last half of the decade. Milwaukee was only three victories short (two in 1956 and one in 1959) of four consecutive NL championships.

Milwaukee's roster still boasted Hall of Famers Hank Aaron, Eddie Mathews and Warren Spahn. But the star players around them, including regulars Del Crandall, Joe Adcock, Bill Bruton, Wes Covington and Johnny Logan, and ace starting pitcher Lew Burdette, began to tail off in production, and the Braves' farm system could not keep up. Dressen was not able to reverse the Braves' slow decline to the middle of the NL pack. They again finished second in 1960 (going 88–66), but a full seven games behind, and were 71–58 and in fourth place late in  when Dressen was replaced on September 2 by Birdie Tebbetts.

In 1962, Dressen returned to the minor leagues for one last assignment. He managed the Toronto Maple Leafs of the Triple-A International League, who had a working agreement with the Braves, to 91 victories.

Last years

As the  season began, Dressen was out of uniform, scouting for the Dodgers. But after the Detroit Tigers won only 24 of their first 60 games under Bob Scheffing, Dressen was hired on June 18 to take over the team.

However, by his third year with Detroit, Dressen's health began to fail. In , a heart attack sidelined him during spring training and he didn't return as the Tigers' manager until May 31. He managed the first 26 games of the  campaign before his hospitalization from a second cardiac event on May 16, leaving the Tigers in the care of acting managers Bob Swift, then, after Swift was sidelined by serious illness himself, Frank Skaff.

Dressen was reported to be recovering from his heart attack when he was stricken with a kidney infection, and died of cardiac arrest in a Detroit hospital on August 10, 1966. Because Dressen's year of birth was commonly listed as 1898 during his baseball career, his age was reported to be 67 at his death. However, recent sources such as Baseball Reference and Retrosheet have "backdated" his birth year to 1894, making him 71 years of age at his passing. He is interred in the Forest Lawn Memorial Park Cemetery in Glendale, California.

Known for his self-confidence, Dressen often told his star-studded Dodgers, "Just hold them for a few innings, fellas. I'll think of something." His career big league managerial record was 1,008–973–9 (.509), including a 298–166 (.642) mark in Brooklyn.

Managerial record

See also

 List of Major League Baseball managers by wins

References

External links
 

Chuck Dressen Bio (Staley Museum)
 
  on What's My Line? (September 28, 1952)

1890s births
1966 deaths
American football defensive linemen
American football quarterbacks
Baseball coaches from Illinois
Baseball players from Illinois
Brooklyn Dodgers coaches
Brooklyn Dodgers managers
Burials at Forest Lawn Memorial Park (Glendale)
Chicago Bears players
Cincinnati Reds managers
Cincinnati Reds players
Decatur Staleys players
Racine Legion players
Detroit Tigers managers
Los Angeles Dodgers coaches
Los Angeles Dodgers scouts
Major League Baseball bench coaches
Major League Baseball third base coaches
Major League Baseball third basemen
Milwaukee Braves managers
Minneapolis Millers (baseball) players
Moline Plowboys players
Nashville Vols managers
Nashville Vols players
New York Giants (NL) players
New York Yankees coaches
Oakland Oaks (baseball) managers
Peoria Tractors players
Players of American football from Illinois
St. Paul Saints (AA) players
Sportspeople from Decatur, Illinois
Toronto Maple Leafs (International League) managers
Washington Senators (1901–1960) managers